prese
In television, a revival is a television series that returns to produce new episodes after being off the air for a certain amount of time, particularly due to cancellation.

Overview
Note: For the sake of simplicity, game shows, due to the large number of international franchises and the much greater rate of cancellation and revival among them, are largely absent from this list. Anthology series revivals, though they may include episodes that are remakes of ones from the earlier series, are generally included.

Legend: "—" = denotes shared name with original work.

See also 
List of television spin-offs

References 

 
Revival
T